Alma is a city in Bacon County, Georgia, United States, and the county seat.  As of the 2020 census, the city had a population of 3,433.

Alma is known as Georgia's blueberry capital, and hosts a Blueberry Festival each June.

History
Alma was founded in 1900 as a stop on the Atlantic Coast Line Railroad. It was incorporated as a city in 1906 and designated seat of the newly formed Bacon County in 1914. There are two theories about the origin of the name of the town. The first is that it was named for the wife of a traveling salesmen, Alma Sheridan; the other is that it was named for the initial letter of the four state capitals Georgia has had: Augusta, Louisville, Milledgeville, and Atlanta.

There are four sites in Alma listed on the National Register of Historic Places: Alma Depot, Bacon County Courthouse, Bacon County School, and the Rabinowitz Building.

Geography
Alma is located in southeastern Georgia at  (31.541543, -82.466666).

The city is located along U.S. Routes 1 and 23. The two run through the center of the city together before splitting just north of the city. U.S. 1 connects the city with Baxley,  to the north, and U.S. 23 connects the city with Hazlehurst,  to the northwest. U.S. 1/23 also lead south together  to Waycross. Other highways that run through the city include Georgia State Routes 32 and 64.

Demographics

2020 census

As of the 2020 United States census, there were 3,433 people, 1,005 households, and 620 families residing in the city.

2000 census
As of the census of 2000, there were 3,236 people, 1,243 households, and 826 families residing in the city. The racial makeup of the city was 57.97% White, 38.57% African American, 0.09% Native American, 0.49% Asian, 1.89% from other races, and 0.99% from two or more races. Hispanic or Latino of any race were 4.42% of the population.

There were 1,243 households, out of which 30.2% had children under the age of 18 living with them, 37.7% were married couples living together, 24.9% had a female householder with no husband present, and 33.5% were non-families. 30.1% of all households were made up of individuals, and 14.9% had someone living alone who was 65 years of age or older. The average household size was 2.50 and the average family size was 3.06.

In the city, the population was spread out, with 26.5% under the age of 18, 10.5% from 18 to 24, 24.0% from 25 to 44, 20.9% from 45 to 64, and 18.0% who were 65 years of age or older. The median age was 36 years. For every 100 females there were 83.3 males. For every 100 females age 18 and over, there were 76.3 males.

The median income for a household in the city was $20,324, and the median income for a family was $21,941. Males had a median income of $25,362 versus $15,583 for females. The per capita income for the city was $11,574. About 27.6% of families and 32.3% of the population were below the poverty line, including 48.7% of those under age 18 and 24.2% of those age 65 or over.

Education 
Alma is served by the Bacon County School District. The district has 126 full-time teachers and over 1,900 students, and operates these schools:
Bacon County Elementary School
Bacon County Primary School
Bacon County Middle School
Bacon County High School

Alma is also served by Coastal Pines Technical College.

Notable people

 Harry Crews, novelist, playwright, short story writer and essayist
 Braswell Deen, U.S. Representative from Georgia; moved to Alma
 Daniel W. Lee, recipient of Congressional Medal of Honor
 Walter J. Leonard, former president of Fisk University
 William M. Wheeler, U.S. Representative from Georgia

See also
 National Register of Historic Places listings in Bacon County, Georgia

References

External links
 City of Alma official website
 Alma/Bacon County Development Authority

Cities in Georgia (U.S. state)
Cities in Bacon County, Georgia
County seats in Georgia (U.S. state)